The Mungo ESK (Einsatzfahrzeug Spezialisierte Kräfte) is an air-transportable, armoured multirole transport vehicle operated by the Airmobile Operations Division and the Rapid Forces Division of the German Army.

The Mungo is based on the Multicar M30/FUMO and is produced by Krauss-Maffei Wegmann. Delivery of 396 Mungos to the German Army began in 2005.

In 2007 all Mungos deployed to the ISAF mission were withdrawn, because the Mungo proved incapable of withstanding the harsh terrain and road conditions of Afghanistan. However, in 2008 the problems were fixed and Mungos were redeployed in Afghanistan.

On May 19, 2009, the German Army ordered a prototype and 25 serial NBC (Nuclear, Biological and Chemical) reconnaissance versions of the Mungo with increased internal volume.

See also
 AGF (Light infantry vehicle)
 Rheinmetall MAN Military Vehicles YAK
 ATF Dingo
 LAPV Enok

References

External links
Mungo on the homepage of the manufacturer KMW
Mungo on the homepage of the German Army

Military trucks
Post–Cold War military vehicles of Germany
Armoured personnel carriers of Germany
Military vehicles introduced in the 2000s
Rheinmetall